Radama may refer to:

Radama I of Madagascar (c. 1793-1828), the first king of Madagascar 
Radama II of Madagascar (1829–1863), king of the Merina Kingdom of Madagascar